Westnewton may refer to:

Westnewton, Cumbria, England
Westnewton, Northumberland, England

See also
West Newton (disambiguation)